The Blood River Sandstone is a geologic formation in Alberta, Canada. It preserves fossils dating back to the Cretaceous period.

See also

 List of fossiliferous stratigraphic units in Alberta

References
 

Cretaceous Alberta